| webcast         = 
| website         = praise1055.com
}}

WGSW is a commercial FM Broadcast Radio Station licensed in the US to Americus, Georgia. WGSW is airing a traditional gospel and urban contemporary gospel format, simulcasting WZBN 105.5 FM Camilla, and is owned by Olive Broadcasting Network.

On November 28, 2022 WGSW changed their format from classic hits (simulcasting WSIZ-FM) to a simulcast of gospel-formatted WZBN 105.5 FM Camilla.

In popular culture, the call letters were used for a fictional New York television station (Channel 8) in Ghostbusters (2016).

Previous logo

References

 WGSW. "FCC Station Information ", Federal Communications Commission, 12/03/2015.
 WGSW. "FCC Ownership Info", Federal Communications Commission, 12/01/2015.

External links

GSW
Radio stations established in 2015
2015 establishments in Georgia (U.S. state)
Gospel radio stations in the United States